Marița may refer to several entities in Romania:

 Marița (river), a tributary of the Cerna in Vâlcea County
 Marița, a village in Călinești Commune, Teleorman County
 Marița, a village in Vaideeni Commune, Vâlcea County